Tom Clancy's The Division is an online-only action role-playing video game developed by Massive Entertainment and published in 2016 by Ubisoft, for PlayStation 4, Windows, and Xbox One. It is set in a near future New York City in the aftermath of a viral pandemic; the player, a Special Agent of the Strategic Homeland Division, is tasked with helping the group rebuild its operations in Manhattan, investigate the nature of the outbreak, and combat criminal activity in its wake. The Division is structured with elements of role-playing games, as well as cooperative and player versus player online multiplayer. This game also marks the debut of Massive and Ubisoft's Snowdrop game engine.

Tom Clancy's The Division received generally positive reviews. A sequel, Tom Clancy's The Division 2 was released in March 2019.

Gameplay 

Tom Clancy's The Division is an action role-playing game set in an open world mid-crisis Manhattan with destructible environments that can be freely explored by the players. The player's mission is to restore order by investigating the source of a virus. The player character can carry three weapons, and explosives like sticky bombs and seeker mines to fight against enemies. Players may take cover behind objects during fire-fights to avoid taking damage from enemies, and to give them a tactical advantage when attacking. The game is played from a third-person perspective, meaning the character model is visible.

As players progress, they earn experience points (commonly known as XP) and currency. They can use this currency to buy weapons and gear, and use the points to learn new talents and skills. The player's gear is categorized into seven levels: worn, standard, specialized, superior, high-end, gear set items or the rarer exotic items, each with a specific color code. Gear can be either bought, or found as in-game loot, or crafted from gathered materials. The storyline missions involve objectives that are relevant to their respective wing of the Base of Operations, which serves as the player's home base. At the player's home base there are three wings: Medical, Security, and Tech. Playing missions for a wing grants the player points for that wing which the player can spend to gain access to new talents, perks and facilities in the Base of Operations. The player will receive intel videos from each head of the wing at certain progression points, which the player can watch. The intel received is specific to its wing, with the Medical wing giving virus reports on the outbreak, the Security wing giving insight into each in-game enemy faction and the Tech wing providing camera footage. The game features a dynamic, time-based weather system which may bring benefits or disadvantages to players. For instance, storms can hinder player's visibility and make aiming difficult. The game also features a day-night cycle which can change the behaviour of enemies in the game.

The Dark Zone is the player-versus-player competitive multiplayer mode featured in The Division, where a lot of high-end weapons are left behind when the military retreats in the game. It is separated from the main campaign and has its own progression system. Higher quality items can be found within the Dark Zone, but are considered "contaminated"; contaminated loot can be stolen by other players, and must be flown out via helicopter in order for them to be available to the player after they leave the Dark Zone. Players can be accompanied by several co-operative partners and other neutral, player-controlled agents. These people, however, can turn against the player at any moment, going rogue. Players' level and ranking may drop if they die too often in the zone.

Plot
On Black Friday 2015, a viral epidemic, transmitted by a Smallpox-based virus planted on banknotes, sweeps through New York City. The disease, known as Green Poison or "The Dollar Flu", causes widespread chaos, and major cities across the United States are placed under quarantine. The U.S. Government activates sleeper agents in the population who operate for the Strategic Homeland Division (or simply "the Division") to assist emergency responders and the National Guard, now called the Joint Task Force (JTF), in restoring order. In Brooklyn, the protagonist, a Division agent, assists the JTF before planning to depart for the Quarantine zone with fellow agent Faye Lau. However, the VTOL meant to take them there is destroyed in an explosion, killing the Division Commander along with most of the second wave and severely wounding Faye Lau. Arriving in a JTF-commandeered news helicopter instead, the Division agents reclaim the James A. Farley Post Office Building as their base of operations. From there, the agents undertake assignments to rescue important personnel, help in restoring the base of operations to full working capacity and combat criminal groups, such as the Rioters, common street thugs in New York who generally want to take advantage of the quarantine; the Rikers, escapees from Rikers Island; and the Cleaners, insane New York Sanitation workers who wield flamethrowers and believe everyone is infected. In the course of the game, the agent helps rescue important personnel like Dr. Jessica Kandel, Captain Roy Benitez and Paul Rhodes. These personnel head the Medical, Security and Tech wings of the base of operations, respectively. Agents also recover a sample of Green Poison. Studying the sample reveals the virus was manufactured and then  heavily modified by a controversial biologist named Dr. Gordon Amherst.

Eventually, the agents find footage of Division agent Aaron Keener going rogue and killing other agents, having gone insane after witnessing the chaos and destruction caused during the breakdown of order following the initial outbreak. It is also discovered Keener and the rest of the first wave of agents who went rogue along with him are assisting the "Last Man Battalion" (LMB), an equally rogue private military company that was abandoned by the government during the evacuation, and are now hostile to it. Working together, these two groups destroyed the VTOL and killed the Commander to weaken Division operations in New York. Intercepting a signal from the Russian consulate, the agents attempt to rescue Vitaly Tchernenko, a Russian virologist who claims to have information on the Green Poison. However, he is kidnapped by Keener and the LMB before the Division can reach him. After helping the JTF secure supplies and weapons, the JTF and Division agents launch an attack on the LMB's base, the now-evacuated United Nations headquarters. The agent finds footage of Keener and his fellow rogue agents abandoning the LMB, with Tchernenko as their prisoner. The leader of the LMB, Charles Bliss, initially escapes in a helicopter, but then returns to make a final stand alongside his men. In the end, the agent destroys the vehicle, killing Bliss. Lau informs the agent that most threats are destroyed or weakened, however the LMB was split into factions. New York is approaching stability, but an unknown signal leads the agent to a secluded laboratory. There, they find Dr. Amherst's remains, having discovered that he has died from exposure to his own virus. They also find a message from Keener, showing he has the technology to manufacture a new strain of Green Poison and intends to do so, and mysteriously tells the agent to explore the center of Manhattan, called the “Dark Zone.” The agent is informed that the information in the lab will further the development of a vaccine and is shown a recovered message from Amherst. In the message, Amherst reveals he engineered Green Poison as part of his eco-terrorist plan to decimate the human race and preserve the planet. If the player follows Keener's instructions, they will discover a message from Keener claiming that he plans to continue with Amherst's plot, as he has come to worship the virus as the judge of all humanity and plans to reverse engineer and improve it; he then offers the player a position beside him based on their actions in the Dark Zone.

Development
Tom Clancy's The Division was originally being developed as an eighth generation consoles exclusive. Shortly after the game's unveiling, Ubisoft stated that other platforms were not ruled out. Ubisoft asked PC gamers to show interest in the game by signing petitions, and then they would decide. The new intellectual property and tech has been in development for several years although development on the actual game began in early 2013.

During E3 2013, the game was officially announced, with a trailer explaining the results of Operation Dark Winter and the purpose of Directive 51. During the Expo, Ubisoft announced a companion app that allows players to play the game on tablets. Players are able to join in the game as a drone to offer tactical support for players playing on PC and consoles. On 20 August 2013, Ubisoft announced that the game would be released for PC on Windows as a result of the "vocal and passionate PC community." On 7 February 2014, Ubisoft announced that Ubisoft Reflections was co-developing the game and was responsible for developing the map-design, character-design and the online components of the game. Red Storm Entertainment, a subsidiary of Ubisoft that was co-founded by Tom Clancy, was also working on the weapon-design of the game. Ubisoft Annecy was also announced to be one of the co-developers of the game on 8 May 2015.

On 15 May 2014, it was announced that The Division would be delayed until 2015, according to an anonymous source inside Massive Entertainment studio. The Division uses Ubisoft's new proprietary engine known as Snowdrop, which is made for PC, PlayStation 4 and Xbox One. On 9 June 2014, The Division was showcased at E3 2014 with an anticipated release for late 2015. In February 2016, Ubisoft announced that downloadable content for The Division would be timed exclusives for Xbox One.

During E3 2015, the game's final release date and a player versus player area known as the Dark Zone were revealed. Its companion app was cancelled, as the company considered that the addition of drones will bring unfairness to the competitive multiplayer mode of the game. Unlike the previous E3 demo, Long Island, and Staten Island do not appear in the game at launch, while Brooklyn only appears in the opening hours of the game as the tutorial area. The beta was set to be released for the Xbox One in December 2015 and for PlayStation 4 and Windows in 2016. On 7 December 2015, Ubisoft announced that The Divisions beta would be moved to "early 2016" and that an Xbox One exclusive alpha would begin on 9 December 2015.

On 26 January 2016, it was confirmed that the Closed Beta would begin on 28 January 2016 for Xbox One and 29 January 2016 for PlayStation 4 and Windows, and end, for all platforms, on 1 February 2016. On 31 January 2016, Ubisoft announced that they had extended the beta, and that it would end on 2 February 2016.

On 9 February 2016, Ubisoft announced that The Divisions open beta would begin for Xbox One on 18 February 2016, and for PC and PlayStation 4 on 19 February 2016, and would end for all platforms on 22 February 2016. Over 6.4 million players, across all platforms, participated in the open beta. On 27 February 2016, Ubisoft confirmed that there would be no microtransactions at launch. The Division was released on 8 March 2016, two years after its initially planned release.

There was a promotional short film released on Amazon Prime Video titled The Division: Agent Origins

Post-release content
The game is supported by additional content, such as daily and weekly missions, Dark Zone missions and free updates, after the game's launch. The April update, Incursions, introduces new gadgets, a new area called Falcon Lost and updated AI to the game. The May update, named Conflict, adds Dark Zone Extraction Hijacking and the new Incursion - Clear Sky, which was released. The game was announced to be supported by 3 paid expansions. In June, Underground, which includes missions set in tunnels and subways, was released. It was reported that it would be followed by Survival, which adds the Survival game mode. Last Stand was set to be released in the last quarter of the year.

Survival and Last Stand were delayed to late 2016 and early 2017, respectively, so that Ubisoft could focus its effort on fixing the core game's issues, such as balancing and bugs. Survival was available on all platforms by December. Last Stand was released on 28 February 2017.

Ubisoft in March 2017 revealed plans for a second year of additional content with two free expansions. Update 1.7 was released on 15 August including additional features and tweaks. The update added "Global Events", limited-time events with gameplay modifiers that give special rewards. It also adds the ability to customize a character's face, cosmetic items as well as "Commendations" which replaces "Feats".

Update 1.8 was released on 5 December 2017. It adds a new area called West Side Pier as well as two new games modes called Resistance and Skirmish. In Resistance,
the player has to fend off waves of enemies. Skirmish is a multiplayer mode where teams of four players have to achieve the highest kill-count.

Reception

Reviews 

Tom Clancy's The Division received "generally favourable" reviews according to review aggregator, Metacritic. Ars Technica drew comparisons between The Division and Destiny, a first-person shooter game with similar overall mechanics regarding items, crafting, and "shared world" elements. The game was also compared to "modern" massively multiplayer online role-playing games (MMORPG), explaining that "structurally, it all feels like it could have been ripped from Guild Wars 2 or a latter-day World of Warcraft," including "that old MMO staple of being stuck in a server queue before diving into a game" on-launch, in combination with the "quintessential Ubisoft design style" of varying types of collectible and upgrade systems. The Division was criticized for lacking variety in its activities and missions, explaining that it "does little to break from or advance what is fast becoming the general form of the "loot shooter" genre. In fact, it takes very few risks at all, particularly with its enemies and encounter design." The Dark Zone was described as being "harrowing", but was panned for sharing characteristics with the post-game content of Destiny, as being the only means of obtaining higher-level gear that is, ultimately, only theoretically needed for further play in the Dark Zone, and for not introducing any major differences in gameplay mechanics like the raids of Destiny.

Vince Ingenito of IGN was more critical of The Division, outlining that "next to every good thing The Division does, there hangs a big, ugly asterisk". The overall atmosphere was panned for being "barren and unengaging" overall; as examples, Ingenito focused upon the lack of dynamic events in the game world, that there were "long stretches of eventless walking where very little happens" due to the lack of events and encounters, the lack of variety in missions and activities, and that the grid layout of Manhattan made navigation and exploration "tedious". The gun mechanics of The Division were described as being "standard" and more in line with the more realistic feel of other Tom Clancy-branded games, with guns that had distinct feels due to their varying statistics, and that "the fact that the action leans so heavily on smart tactics makes it rewarding when the last foe in a pack finally goes down."

The progression system was also criticized for being "fractured", requiring that players visit multiple locations with different systems in order to upgrade their abilities, explaining that "[it's] hard to accurately gauge just how strong you really are, and as a result, easy to get in over your head in a mission that your character level indicates you can handle." While noting that its "post-game" content was mainly limited to harder versions of story missions with stronger "bullet sponge" enemies, Ingenito praised the Dark Zone for "[fixing] just about every problem I have with The Division's pacing, its lack of player-driven moments, and the overall toothlessness and emptiness of its open world", by adding an "omnipresent" danger and a higher degree of risk to player interactions. In conclusion, Ingenito felt that the game's ideas and mechanics were "not spread evenly or interwoven cleanly enough to form a cohesive, consistently enjoyable loop".

Prior to version 1.0.2 of the game, named enemy NPCs would respawn indefinitely, as long as their entourage of minions were never killed. This allowed players to collect the named enemies' superior and high-end loot over and over again. The most popular target of this exploit was a character known as the Bullet King, as this character was the named enemy closest to any player spawn point in the game. The glitch has been resolved in patch 1.0.2 of the game, released by Ubisoft on 22 March 2016.  An exotic weapon (the highest quality weapon), an LMG whose ability allows its user to never reload while firing, was named after the character in The Division 2.

Sales
According to Ubisoft, the game broke company records, including highest number of first-day sales (breaking the record previously set by Watch Dogs in 2014), and becoming the company's best-selling game. The Division also broke the industry record for biggest first-week launch for a new game franchise, generating an estimated amount of $330 million globally. The retail version of The Division was the best selling game in its week of release in the U.K. and Ireland, debuting at No. 1 in the UK retail software sales chart. The game's launch marked the biggest video game debut in the first quarter of the year in the U.K., breaking the record previously held by Sony's Gran Turismo 4. It was the third biggest launch of a Ubisoft game in the U.K., behind Assassin's Creed III and Watch Dogs. The game has the highest week one sales for a new intellectual property, breaking the record held by Destiny. The game was No. 1 in Japan, selling over 80,000 units in its first week. The NPD Group indicated that the retail version of The Division was the best selling game in March 2016 in the U.S. The game sold more than 10 million copies during the eighth generation of video game consoles.

Film adaptation
In June 2016, it was announced that a live action feature film adaption of The Division is in development. Jake Gyllenhaal was cast to star in the lead role, and to co-produce the film with CEO of Ubisoft Motion Pictures, Gerard Guillemot. By August, Jessica Chastain was cast in the co-starring role of the film.

In January 2017, Stephen Gaghan was attached to direct, though he left the project in 2018. In April 2018, David Leitch signed on as director. Kelly McCormick, Gyllenhaal, Guillemot, Riva Marker, Chastain and Kelly Carmichael will act as producers for the film.

In June 2019 during Ubisoft's E3 2019 presentation, the company announced that Rafe Judkins serves as screenwriter. Netflix purchased the distribution rights to the film, and will exclusively release the feature through its streaming service. The project is a joint venture between Nine Stories Productions, Freckle Films, 87North, and Ubisoft Motion Pictures. On February 25, 2021, Deadline reports that Rawson Marshall Thurber will replace Leitch as director due of Leitch's scheduling conflicts with the film Bullet Train but will stay on as producer.

In December 2022, producer Kelly McCormick revealed that the project has been postponed indefinitely.

Sequel 
On 9 March 2018, a sequel to the game, Tom Clancy's The Division 2, was announced, that was currently being worked on by Massive Entertainment. The game was officially premiered at the Electronic Entertainment Expo 2018 in June 2018. On 10 June 2018, Tom Clancy’s The Division 2 was announced to be released on 15 March 2019, with the game set to take place within Washington, D.C. after it falls into anarchy, and six months after the events of Tom Clancy's The Division.

Notes

References

External links

2016 video games
Bioterrorism in fiction
Fiction about diseases and disorders
Dystopian video games
Loot shooters
Massive Entertainment games
Mass murder in fiction
Multiplayer video games
Open-world video games
PlayStation 4 Pro enhanced games
PlayStation 4 games
Post-apocalyptic video games
Third-person shooters
Tom Clancy games
Ubisoft franchises
Ubisoft games
Video games adapted into comics
Video games about viral outbreaks
Video games developed in Sweden
Video games set in New York City
Video games set in the future
Windows games
Xbox One games